Gleason House may refer to:

in the United States (by state then city or town)
William H. Gleason House, Melbourne, Florida, listed on the National Register of Historic Places (NRHP) in Brevard County
F. C. Gleason House, Jerome, Idaho, listed on the NRHP in Jerome County
Belvidere (West Roxbury, Massachusetts), a former house in West Roxbury neighborhood of Boston, Massachusetts, home of Frederick Gleason
Bacon-Gleason-Blodgett Homestead, Bedford, Massachusetts, NRHP-listed in Middlesex County
Dr. Edward Francis Gleason House, Barnstable, Massachusetts, NRHP-listed in Barnstable County
James Gleason Cottage, Southbridge, Massachusetts, NRHP-listed in Worcester County
Lucius Gleason House, Liverpool, New York, NRHP-listed in Onondaga County
Round Rock Hill, Peekskill, New York, a home of Jackie Gleason
Edmund Gleason House, Valley View, Ohio, also known as Edmund Gleason Farm, listed on the NRHP in Cuyahoga County
Abell-Gleason House, Charlottesville, Virginia, listed on the NRHP
Hotel Gleason/Albemarle Hotel, Imperial Cafe, Charlottesville, Virginia, listed on the NRHP

See also
Gleason Building (disambiguation)
Gleason Publishing Hall, a historic former building and a publishing company associated with Frederick Gleason
Whitehill-Gleason Motors, Pittsburgh, Pennsylvania, listed on the NRHP in Pittsburgh